Lagoa is a settlement in the central part of the island of Santo Antão, Cape Verde. In 2010 its population was 358. It is situated at about 1,200 m elevation on the eastern plateau of Santo Antão, 11 km northwest of the island capital Porto Novo. The Moroços Natural Park lies about 3 km west of Lagoa.

See also
List of villages and settlements in Cape Verde

References

Villages and settlements in Santo Antão, Cape Verde
Porto Novo Municipality